Mary Esther Beckman (born September 1953) is a Professor Emerita of Linguistics at the Ohio State University.

Career
Beckman received her PhD from Cornell University in 1984. She was a Postdoctoral member of the technical staff in "Linguistics and Artificial Intelligence Research" at AT&T Bell Laboratories, Murray Hill, NJ, before joining the linguistics faculty at Ohio State University in 1985. She has directed at least twenty-five PhD dissertations to completion at Ohio State University. 

Her early research focused on prosody and the development of the Tones and Boundary Indexes (ToBI) system of intonation transcription.  More recently her work has focused on phonological disorders and child language acquisition.

Perhaps her most significant contribution to linguistics is the fact that in 1987, together with John Kingston, she organized the first Laboratory Phonology conference at Columbus, Ohio. She served with Kingston as series editor for the Cambridge University Press series Papers in Laboratory Phonology from 1987 through 2004.  The laboratory phonology movement was one of the two most important developments during the 1990s in the linguistic subdisciplines that study language sound systems, and gave rise to the Association for Laboratory Phonology. (The other important development was Optimality Theory.)

Honors and awards 
In 1988 she won a Presidential Young Investigator Award from the National Science Foundation. 

She edited the Journal of Phonetics from 1990 to 1994. 

Beckman was inducted as a Fellow in the Linguistic Society of America in 2011. In 2015, she received the Scientific Achievement Medal of the International Speech Communication Association.

Personal life 
Beckman is married to John S. Cikoski, a specialist for Classical Chinese.

Selected publications
 
 
 
Beckman, Mary, Ken de Jong, Sun-Ah Jun, & Sook-hyang Lee (1992) “The Interaction of Coarticulation and Prosody in Sound Change,” Language and Speech 35 (1, 2). pp. 45–58.

References

External links
Mary E. Beckman's Faculty Website
LSA Institute 2005 Bio of Mary Beckman

Linguists from the United States
Cornell University alumni
Ohio State University faculty
Phoneticians
Phonologists
1953 births
Living people
Speech perception researchers
Women linguists
Fellows of the Linguistic Society of America